A cryptographic key is called static if it is intended for use for a relatively long period of time and is typically intended for use in many instances of a cryptographic key establishment scheme. Contrast with an ephemeral key.

See also
 Cryptographic key types
 Recommendation for Key Management — Part 1: general, 
 NIST Cryptographic Toolkit

Key management